P&O Building may refer to:

 P&O Building (Fremantle)
 P&O Building (Perth)